Rijal (Rizal) is a surname that belongs to the people of Nepal. Most of the Rijals are inhabitant in western Nepal. Dhananjaya is the Gotra associated with this surname.

 Abhishek Rijal, Nepalese Football Player
 Bhola Rijal, Nepalese gynecologist and poet
 Minendra Rijal, Ph.D. Former Minister, Nepali politician and current member of the house of representatives
 Nagendra Prasad Rijal, former Nepalese Prime Minister
 Priti Rijal, a Nepalese tennis player
 Raju Rijal, Nepalese cricketer
 Tek Nath Rizal, Bhutanese politician of Nepalese descent
 Rajin Rijal

Rijals live in Nepal, India, Malaysia, Indonesia, the Philippines, the USA, the UK, Australia in significant numbers and few families live in more than 100 countries.

See also
 Ilm al-Rijal or Asma al-Rijal 
Surnames of Nepalese origin
Khas surnames